Thekkady(Idukki district) is a town near Periyar National Park, an important tourist attraction in the Kerala state of India. The name Thekkady is derived from the word "thekku" which means teak. Temperatures are lowest in the months of December–January and highest in the months of April–May.

Overview 
Thekkady is located 4 km away from Kumily, a plantation town in Kerala-Tamil Nadu border. The sanctuary is famous for its dense evergreen, semi-evergreen, moist deciduous forests and savanna grass lands. It is home to herds of elephants, sambar, tigers, gaur, lion-tailed macaques and Nilgiri langurs. Due to the density of the forest, sightings of elephants and especially tigers are highly unlikely.

The wildlife sanctuary was declared a tiger reserve in 1978. The splendid artificial lake formed by the Mullaperiyar Dam across the Periyar River adds to the charm of the park. The greatest attractions of Periyar are the herds of wild elephants, deer and bison that come down to drink in the lake. The sanctuary can be accessed by trekking, boating or jeep safari.

Thekkady is considered a haven for natural spices such as black pepper, cardamom, cinnamon, nutmeg, nutmace, ginger, and clove.

Nearby places of interest

Ottakathalamedu
One of the highest Mountain for trekking. Jeep trip is available from Kumily. Thekkady lake is visible from the top of the mountain.

Murikkady
This place consists of spices and coffee plantations. It is about 5 km from Thekkady.

Chellar Kovil
This is located about 15 km from Kumily en route to the Theni district of Tamil Nadu. This place has a lot of picturesque waterfalls and cascades.

Anakkara

Located at about 13 km from Kumily on the Kumily-Munnar road. A new airport is proposed at Anakkara and is under review by the Airports Authority of India.
Anakkara is famous for spice garden. All variety of spices available.

Mangala Devi Temple

It is situated about 18 km from Thekkady at an altitude of 1341 m above sea level. It is surrounded by lush greenery and is closed throughout the year except during the Chitra Pournami festival. At other times tourists can still visit it by getting a special letter from the forest ranger. The view from the temple premises is spectacular and one can see part of Eastern Ghats and some villages from adjacent state of Tamil Nadu.

Periyar National Park 
It is spread across an area of 300 square miles, Periyar National Park is covered by lush evergreen and deciduous forests serving as home to various animals such as deer, elephants, sambar, Nilgiri Langurs

Pattumalay 
Pattumalay literally means hills draped in silk. It is known for its lofty peaks, little streams, tea plantations and tea factories. This beautiful region in Idukki is 8 km from Peermade and 24 km from Thekkady. One of the major attractions of this region is The Velankanni Matha Church situated atop a hill. This is a famous pilgrim center, and is built entirely from granite. Pattumalay is also home of the biggest names in the tea production sector - Harrisons Malayalam limited Pattumalay Estate.

Pattumalay Tea Factory 
Pattumalay Tea Factory is situated 24 km from Thekkady. Pattumalay Tea Factory is a major producer of Orthodox tea and belongs to Harrisons Malayalam Limited. It is the oldest Orthodox factory and also owns central Travancore only Orthodox Tea Factory. It has capacity of 16000 kg per day. The Pattumalay Estate was established in the year of 1931.

Boat tragedy

Gallery

See also 
Vellaramkunnu
Kumily

References

External links

 
 The Hindu Report on Thekkady Boat Accident

Cities and towns in Idukki district
Tourism in Kerala
Tourist attractions in Idukki district
Geography of Idukki district
Lakes of Kerala